is a Japanese voice actor from Saitama Prefecture, Japan. He was originally affiliated with Ken Production, but as of 2015, he is freelance.

Filmography

Anime
2008
 Kannagi: Crazy Shrine Maidens (Chinpira)
2009
 Kobato (Hiroyasu Ueda)
 Taishō Baseball Girls (Kuchikata, Saitō)
 Battle Spirits: Shōnen Gekiha Dan (Kugutsu)
2010
 Demon King Daimao (2V)
 Ikki Tousen: Xtreme Xecutor (Takafumi)
 SD Gundam Sangokuden Brave Battle Warriors (Chōryō Gelgoog)
 Big Windup! Season 2 (Takeshi Kurata)
 Fairy Tail (Zatō)
2011
 Un-Go (Arata Oyamada)
 Gintama (Issac Schneider)
 Little Battlers Experience (Kuroki)
 Chihayafuru (Ryūgasaki)
 Beelzebub (Ryūji Sanada, Shimamura, Kōtarō Mikagami)
 Ben-To (Goatee)
2012
 Mobile Suit Gundam AGE (Dalesto Coon)
 Guilty Crown (Takaomi Sudō)
 Kuroko's Basketball (Yoshitaka Moriyama)
 Shakugan no Shana III (Final) (Wodan)
 Smile PreCure! (Seiji Igami, Student Council President)
 My Little Monster (Mitsuyoshi Misawa)
2013
 Attack on Titan (Nack Tierce)
2014
 Dramatical Murder (Trip)
2015
 Assassination Classroom (Ryūki)
2016
 Assassination Classroom 2nd Season (Ryūki)

Theatrical animation
 The Disappearance of Haruhi Suzumiya (Kennosuke Arakawa)
 Friends: Mononoke Shima no Naki (Tasuke)

Video games
 Blaze Union: Story to Reach the Future (Ordene)
 Disorder 6 (Date)
 Dragon Age II (Zevran Arainai)
 Generation of Chaos: Pandora’s Reflection (Morgan)
 Luminous Arc 2 (Master Mattias)
 Shin Megami Tensei: Devil Survivor (Azuma)
 Time Hollow (Tamotsu Tokio)

Dubbing
 Anonymous (Henry Wriothesley)
 Battle: Los Angeles (Peter Kerns)
 Captain America: The First Avenger (Gilmore Hodge (Lex Shrapnel))
 The Dilemma (Zip)
 The Girl with the Dragon Tattoo (Trinity)
 Glee (Mike Chang, Josh)
 Iron Man: Armored Adventures (Happy Hogan)
 J. Edgar (Agent Jones)
 The Pacific (Robert Oswalt)
 Pretty Little Liars (Ian Thomas)
 Smokin' Aces 2: Assassins' Ball (Troy)
 Spartacus: Blood and Sand (Doctore)
 Splice (Gavin Nicoli)
 Star Wars: The Clone Wars (San Hill)

References

External links
 

Living people
1984 births
Japanese male voice actors
Male voice actors from Saitama Prefecture
21st-century Japanese male actors
Ken Production voice actors